Sentinel-1 is the first of the Copernicus Programme satellite constellation conducted by the European Space Agency. This mission was originally composed of a constellation of two satellites, Sentinel-1A and Sentinel-1B, which shared the same orbital plane. Two more satellites, Sentinel-1C and Sentinel-1D are in development. Sentinel-1B has been retired, leaving Sentinel-1A the only satellite of the constellation. The Sentinel-1 satellites carry a C-band synthetic-aperture radar instrument which provides a collection of data in all-weather, day or night. This instrument has a spatial resolution of down to 5 m and a swath of up to 400 km. The satellites orbit a Sun synchronous, near-polar (98.18°) orbit. The orbit has a 12-day repeat cycle and completes 175 orbits per cycle.

The first satellite, Sentinel-1A, launched on 3 April 2014, and Sentinel-1B was launched on 25 April 2016. Both satellites lifted off from the Guiana Space Centre in Kourou, French Guiana, and each on a Soyuz rocket. Sentinel-1C and 1D are in development with Sentinel-1C set for launch in April 2023.

There are a wide range of applications for the data collected via the Sentinel-1 mission. A few of these uses include sea and land monitoring, emergency response due to environmental disasters, and economic applications. A major goal of the mission was to provide C-Band SAR data. Recently, Sentinel-1 has worked in conjunction with SMAP to help achieve a more accurate measure of soil moisture estimates. Observations from both instruments show to be complementary of each other as they combine data of soil moisture contents.

The ESA and European Commission's policies makes Sentinel-1's data easily accessible. Various users can acquire the data and use it for public, scientific, or commercial purposes for free.

Instruments 
Sentinel-1 spacecraft are designed to carry the following instruments:

 A single C-band synthetic-aperture radar (C-SAR) with its electronics. This instrument provides 1 dB radiometric accuracy with a central frequency at 5.405 GHz. The data collected in C-SAR was made to be continuous after the termination of a previous mission (Envisat mission).
 An SDRAM-based Data Storage and Handling Assembly (DSHA), with an active data storage capacity of about 1,443 Gbit (168 GiB), receiving data streams from SAR-SES over two independent links gathering SAR_H and SAR_V polarization, with a variable data rate up to 640 Mbit/s on each link, and providing 520 Mbit/s X-band fixed-user data-downlink capability over two independent channels towards ground.

Characteristics 
Specifications of the Sentinel-1 satellites:
 7 year lifetime (12 years for consumables)
 Launcher: Soyuz
 Near-polar (98.18°) Sun-synchronous orbit
  altitude
 12-day repeat cycle
 175 revolutions per cycle
 98.6 minute orbital period
 3-axis altitude stabilization
  launch mass
  dimensions

Operational/acquisition modes 
Sentinel-1 has four operational modes:
 Strip Map (SM) Mode features  spatial resolution and an  swath.
 The sole uses of SM are to monitor small islands as well as emergency management for extraordinary events upon request
 Offers data products in single (HH or VV) or double (HH + HV or VV + VH) polarization
 Interferometric Wide Swath (IW) Mode features  spatial resolution and a  swath.
 IW is the main operational mode over land
 IW accomplishes interferometry through burst synchronization
 Offers data products in single (HH or VV) or double (HH + HV or VV + VH) polarization
 Extra Wide Swath (EW) Mode features  spatial resolution and a  swath.
 EW is used mainly to monitor wide coastal areas for phenomena such as shipping traffic and potential environmental hazards like oil spills or changes in sea ice.
 Offers data products in single (HH or VV) or double (HH + HV or VV + VH) polarization
 Wave (WV) Mode features  resolution and a low data rate.
 This is the main operational mode over open ocean.
 Offers data products only in single (HH or VV) polarization

Data products 
Sentinel-1 has four types of data products:
 Raw Level 0 data
 Processed Level 1 Single Look Complex (SLC) data:
 Complex images with phase and amplitude of specified areas
 Ground Range Detected (GRD) Level 1 data:
 Only systematically distributed multi-looked intensity
 Level 2 Ocean (OCN) data:
 Systematically distributed data of ocean's geophysical parameters

All data levels are publicly available for free online within 24 hours of observation.

Applications 
Sentinel-1 will provide continuity of data from the ERS and Envisat missions, with further enhancements in terms of revisit, coverage, timeliness and reliability of service.

A summary of the main applications of Sentinel-1 include:
 Marine monitoring
 Sea-ice levels and conditions
 Ocean oil spills
 Ship activity
 Marine winds
 Land monitoring
 Agriculture
 Forestry
Subsidence
The C-SAR instrument is capable of measuring land subsidence through the creation of interferometric synthetic-aperture radar (InSAR) images. The analysis of phase changes between two or more synthetic aperture radar images taken at different times is able to create maps of the digital elevation and measure the land surface deformation of an area. High spatial (20m) and temporal (6 days) resolutions allow S1 to improve on current InSAR techniques and provide systematic continuity to the data.
 Emergency response
 Flooding
 Landslide and volcanic
 Earthquakes
 Shortly after the August 2014 South Napa earthquake, data collected by Sentinel-1A was used to develop an interferometric synthetic-aperture radar, or InSAR, image of the affected region. The Sentinel-1 satellites are expected to make analysis of earthquakes using InSAR techniques quicker and simpler.

Industrial 
The prime contractor of the mission is Thales Alenia Space Italy, with whole system integration and also with production of platform Spacecraft Management Unit (SMU) and payload Data Storage and Handling Assembly (DSHA). Sentinel-1A was constructed in Rome, Italy. Other technologies such as the T/R modules, the C-band synthetic-aperture radar antenna, the advanced data management and transmission subsystems, and the on-board computer, were developed in L'Aquila and Milan. The C-SAR instrument is the responsibility of Astrium Gmbh.

The ground segment prime contractor is Astrium with subcontractors Telespazio, WERUM, Advanced Computer Systems and Aresys. Final test verification of the satellite was completed at Thales Alenia Space's clean rooms in Rome and Cannes.

Spacecraft 
 Sentinel-1A – launched on 3 April 2014
 Sentinel-1B – launched on 25 April 2016, unavailable due to a power issue since 23 December 2021, mission end declared 3 August 2022
 Sentinel-1C – development contract signed with Thales Alenia Space of Italy in December 2015; launch scheduled for April 2023
 Sentinel-1D – development contract signed with Thales Alenia Space of Italy in December 2015; launch scheduled for the second half of 2024

Gallery 
Examples of images produced from Sentinel-1 data.

References

External links 

 Sentinel-1 at ESA's Sentinel Online
 Sentinel-1 at ESA's Earth Online
 Sentinel-1 at ESA's Observing the Earth
 Sentinel-1 Scientific Data Hub by ESA
 Sentinel-1 fact sheet  by the European Union
 Copernicus Programme

Copernicus Programme
Earth observation satellites of the European Space Agency
Space synthetic aperture radar